The 1880–81 season was the eighth Scottish football season in which Dumbarton competed at a national level.

Scottish Cup

Following some easy wins in the early rounds, and two impressive away victories in the quarter and semi finals, against Rangers and local rivals Vale of Leven respectively, Dumbarton reach their first Scottish Cup final.  In the first playing of the final, Queen's Park defeated Dumbarton by the odd goal in three, but after a successful protest due to 'crowd encroachment', a replay was ordered.  However despite good play in the second game, Dumbarton were well beaten losing 1-3.

Glasgow Charity Cup

Dumbarton were again invited to take part in the Glasgow Charity Cup but were heavily defeated in the semi final by Rangers.

Friendlies

Dumbarton's fixture list for the season included home and away ties against the Ayrshire Cup holders, Beith and the first club 'tour' of the north of England was undertaken during the New Year holidays with a further match being played against Blackburn Rovers during the Easter break. In all, 19 'friendly' matches were played during the season, of which 13 were won, 2 drawn and 4 lost, scoring 62 goals and conceding 26.

Player statistics

Of note amongst those donning the club's colours for the first time were James Liddle, James McAulay and Michael Paton.

Only includes appearances and goals in competitive Scottish Cup matches.

Source:

International Cap

International trial matches were played on 26 February and 5 March 1881 to consider selection of teams to represent Scotland in the upcoming games against England and Wales. Jock Hutcheson, Andrew Kennedy, John Kennedy, Joe Lindsay, James McAulay, William McKinnon, James Meikleham and Peter Miller all took part.

As a result Dumbarton's Joe Lindsay picked up his second and third caps playing for Scotland against England and Wales respectively.  McKinnon was selected as a reserve.

Representative Match
Robert Brown, John Kennedy, Joe Lindsay, William McKinnon and Peter Miller were all selected to play in the Scotch Counties team which played Birmingham & District on 19 February 1881.  The 'Scotch' men won 6-0 with both Brown and Lindsay scoring twice.

References

Dumbarton F.C. seasons
Scottish football clubs 1880–81 season